Terpentedienyl-diphosphate synthase (terpentedienol diphosphate synthase, Cyc1, clerodadienyl diphosphate synthase) is an enzyme with systematic name terpentedienyl-diphosphate lyase (decyclizing). This enzyme catalyses the following chemical reaction

 geranylgeranyl diphosphate  terpentedienyl diphosphate

This enzyme requires Mg2+.

References

External links 
 

EC 5.5.1